The Holt–Saylor–Liberto House is a house located in southwest Portland, Oregon, that is listed on the National Register of Historic Places.  It was added to the register in 1978.  Earlier, it was designated a Portland Historic Landmark by the city's Historic Landmarks Commission, in October 1977.

See also
 National Register of Historic Places listings in Southwest Portland, Oregon

References

1888 establishments in Oregon
Houses completed in 1888
Houses on the National Register of Historic Places in Portland, Oregon
Queen Anne architecture in Oregon
Homestead, Portland, Oregon
Portland Historic Landmarks